is a Japanese manga series written and illustrated by Yūki Tabata. It has been serialized in Shueisha's shōnen manga magazine Weekly Shōnen Jump since February 2015, with its chapters collected in 34 tankōbon volumes as of March 2023. The story follows Asta, a young boy born without any magic power. This is unknown to the world he lives in because seemingly everyone has some sort of magic power. With his fellow mages from the Black Bulls, Asta plans to become the next Wizard King.

The manga was first adapted into an original video animation produced by Xebec Zwei, released in 2017. An anime television series adaptation produced by Pierrot aired in Japan on TV Tokyo from October 2017 to March 2021. An anime film, titled Black Clover: Sword of the Wizard King, is set to premiere simultaneously in Japanese theaters and internationally on Netflix in June 2023.

In North America, the manga is licensed for English release by Viz Media, while the anime series is licensed by Crunchyroll.

Plot

The series focuses on Asta, a young orphan who is left to be raised in an orphanage alongside his fellow orphan, Yuno. While everyone is born with the ability to utilize mana in the form of magical power, Asta, with no magic instead focuses on physical strength. Conversely, Yuno was born as a prodigy with immense magical power and the talent to control wind magic.  

Motivated by a desire to become the next Wizard King, an authority figure second to the king of Clover Kingdom, the two youths developed a friendly rivalry. Yuno obtains a legendary four-leaf grimoire held by the kingdom's first Wizard King. The four-leaf grimoire is a rare grimoire, only given to the most immense mages. Asta, despite his lack of magic, obtained a mysterious five-leaf grimoire that contains mysterious elf swords and a bodiless member of the Devil race who utilizes rare anti-magic. Afterward, he and Yuno each join a Magic Knight squad as the first step to fulfill their ambitions. 

Asta joins the Black Bulls under Yami Sukehiro alongside Noelle Silva while Yuno becomes a member of the Golden Dawn. They embark on various adventures while contending with an extremist group called the Eye of the Midnight Sun, whose leadership is manipulated by a Devil in avenging an injustice committed against the Elves by the Clover Kingdom at the time of its founding. The Magic Knights then face the Dark Triad of the Spade Kingdom, with Asta and Yuno learning of their Devils’ influence on their lives and of the Dark Triad’s plan to fully manifest the Devils into their world.

Production
Manga author Yūki Tabata started in the manga industry at the age of 20 and worked as an assistant for seven years before his science fiction one-shot Hungry Joker was briefly serialized in the Shueisha magazine Weekly Shōnen Jump. Tabata considered this manga a failure which he attributed largely to its quiet and dark-natured main character, who was very unlike the author himself. After its cancellation his friends advised him to develop an energetic, happy-go-lucky protagonist that more closely resembled Tabata and he began working on the fantasy-themed one-shot for Black Clover. After its publication, he was assigned a new editor (Tatsuhiko Katayama) and Shueisha picked up the series for full serialization.

The weekly production process for Black Clover involved Tabata consulting with Katayama for the first few days on the thumbnails of the chapter then spending the remaining days composing the actual art. Tabata credited himself for coming up with a rough outline and ending for the chapter while Katayama aided him in filling in its content and making corrections. Early in the series the artist claimed to only sleep an average of three hours per night due to stress, but after the anime adaptation of Black Clover began airing he was able to increase this to six hours per night. As of at least the seventh volume of Black Clover, he did not utilize digital tools in his drafting, opting for traditional "analog" inking and toning by hand. Tabata stayed motivated during the manga's long run due to his readers looking forward to each week's chapter. Despite the fast pace of most chapters, the author expressed a desire to occasionally create slower yet still satisfying stories. The dark fantasy seinen series Berserk by Kentaro Miura was a heavy influence on Tabata. He wanted to craft a shōnen equivalent of Berserk while also taking inspiration from other fantasy properties such as Dragon Quest: The Adventure of Dai, The Lord of the Rings, Harry Potter, and the films of Guillermo del Toro. Tabata professed to not be a big fan of fantasy role-playing video games like Dragon Quest or Final Fantasy and used the few fantasy movies he did watch as reference material. To give Black Clover's world a European look, Tabata researched photograph books for sets and locations and documented various weapons, clothing, and buildings.

Tabata stated he enjoyed both writing the manga's script and illustrating its battle scenes, particularly in magnifying his characters' movements and making the action more dynamic. For this latter aspect, he took ideas from the shōnen fighting manga Dragon Ball by Akira Toriyama. Tabata recounted he was inspired to become a manga artist after seeing the Dragon Ball Z anime series as a child then learning it was an adaptation of Toriyama's work. He stated that he was also a fan of other shōnen series, such as YuYu Hakusho by Yoshihiro Togashi and Bleach by Tite Kubo. Tabata wished to create a diverse cast of archetypical characters with opposing attributes. He modeled the characters Asta and Charmy Pappitson after himself and his wife respectively. He admitted in the manga's fourth volume that Charmy was his favorite character to draw. He chose names for characters by looking up words he found interesting in dictionaries of various languages. He found that an important aspect of character design in Black Clover was giving them traits that make them easy to remember for the reader. He also wanted to "feel good" drawing them, would revise the characters if he was getting frustrated, and strived to improve on balancing the attention each one gets during the course of the story. Once the characters were made, Tabata decided on their magic abilities based on their personalities and whatever magic would fit the current events of the plot.

Media

Manga

Written and illustrated by Yūki Tabata, Black Clover has been serialized in Shueisha's shōnen manga anthology Weekly Shōnen Jump since February 16, 2015. The manga is Tabata's second series in Weekly Shōnen Jump: his first series, Hungry Joker, ran in the magazine for 24 chapters from November 12, 2012, to May 13, 2013, before being canceled. In April 2022, it was announced that the series would enter on a three-month hiatus to prepare it for its final arc. Shueisha has collected its chapters into individual tankōbon volumes. The first volume was published on June 4, 2015. As of March 3, 2023, thirty-four volumes have been released.

On February 9, 2015, Viz Media announced that they would publish the first three chapters of the series in their Weekly Shonen Jump digital magazine as part of their "Jump Start" program in North America. On March 30, 2015, they announced that the series would join their weekly lineup, beginning with chapter 4 on April 6, and publishing at an accelerated rate until the chapters were current with Japan. Plans to release the series in print were announced during their panel at New York Comic Con on October 9, 2015. Shueisha began to simulpublish the series in English on the app and website Manga Plus in February 2019.

Spin-offs
A gag manga spin-off by Setta Kobayashi, titled , was serialized in Shueisha's Saikyō Jump from February 2, 2018, to April 1, 2021. Shueisha collected its chapters in three tankōbon volume, released from January 4, 2019, to July 2, 2021.

On September 30, 2018, a manga based on the video game Black Clover: Quartet Knights, illustrated by Yumiya Tashiro, launched on the Shōnen Jump+ app on October 7, 2018, and finished on April 12, 2020. Its chapters were collected in six tankōbon volumes, released from January 4, 2019, to October 2, 2020.

Novels
Three novels written by Johnny Onda have been released under the Jump J-Books imprint. The first, was released on August 4, 2016; the second, was released on October 4, 2017; and the third, was released on October 4, 2019.

Anime

Original video animation
An original video animation (OVA) produced by Xebec Zwei that is based on the series was shown at the 2016 Jump Festa between November 27 and December 18, 2016. It was bundled with the 11th volume of the manga, which was released on May 2, 2017. A second original video animation was shown at the 2018 Jump Festa. It was later released on DVD releases alongside My Hero Academia and Food Wars!: Shokugeki no Soma bundled with the future volumes of their respective manga, as it was announced on Jump Special Anime Festa event.

Television series

At the Black Clover Jump Festa event on December 18, 2016, an anime television series adaptation by Pierrot was announced. It was directed by Tatsuya Yoshihara, with Kazuyuki Fudeyasu writing scripts, Itsuko Takeda doing character designs, and Minako Seki composing the music. The series premiered on TV Tokyo on October 3, 2017. with the first two seasons each consisting of 51 episodes. 

Season 3 premiered on October 1, 2019. The anime has been broadcast without any major interruption until late April 2020, when it was announced that future episodes would be postponed based on studio production delays caused by the COVID-19 pandemic. The broadcasting and distribution of episode 133 onward were delayed and in its place, the first episode of the series was rebroadcast on May 5, 2020; the series resumed on July 7 of the same year, and finished at episode 170 on March 30, 2021.

Crunchyroll has simulcast the series, while Funimation produced an English dub as part of its SimulDub program as it aired. Adult Swim's Toonami programming block premiered the English dub on December 2, 2017. The series was added to the Hulu streaming service. Sony Pictures UK and Funimation released the first part of the series on home video in the United Kingdom and Ireland, with subsequent parts released by Manga Entertainment. Universal Sony classified the first part of the series for release in Australia and New Zealand, on behalf of Funimation, with Madman Entertainment releasing subsequent parts. The first of Black Clover became available on Netflix India with Japanese audio and English subtitles on February 23, 2021.

Original net animation
A short original net animation titled , produced by DLE and directed by Tsukasa Nishiyama, began airing on dTV on July 1, 2019. The opening theme song for the short is "Possible" by Gakuto Kajiwara and Nobunaga Shimazaki, under the name "Clover×Clover". Crunchyroll made the short available internationally on December 31, 2019.

Film

On March 28, 2021, it was announced that the series would be receiving an anime film, with details to be revealed at a later date. It will be directed by Ayataka Tanemura, with the screenplay written by Johnny Onda and Ai Orii, character designs by Itsuko Takeda, and music by Minako Seki. Tabata will also supervise the film and provide the original character designs. The film was originally set to premiere simultaneously in Japanese theaters and internationally on Netflix on March 31, 2023, but was later delayed to June 16th of the same year due to the COVID-19 pandemic affecting its production. Treasure will perform the theme song "Here I Stand".

Video games
At Jump Festa 2017, a video game, titled Black Clover: Quartet Knights, was announced for a 2018 release on PlayStation 4 and PC. It was developed by Ilinx and published by Bandai Namco. It was released in Japan on September 13, 2018, while the western release was on September 14 of the same year. 

On April 22, 2018, a mobile game called  was announced. It was released in Japan on November 14, 2018. On December 6, 2019, Bandai Namco Entertainment announced that the game would be released on January 16, 2020. On December 9, 2020, Bandai Namco Entertainment closed its servers and removed the game from all IOS and Android mobile app stores worldwide.

Asta is featured as a playable character in the Weekly Shōnen Jump crossover game Jump Force.

On December 19, 2021, during Jump Festa 2022, a mobile game was announced. Titled  and developed by Vic Game Studios, it was originally announced to be released sometime in 2022; however, it was later announced that it will be released in worldwide in the first half of 2023. The band Glay contributed two songs to the game;  and "Pianista".

Reception

Manga
In 2016, Black Clover ranked ninth on the second Next Manga Award, presented by Kadokawa Corporation's Da Vinci magazine and Niconico streaming website; in the same year, the series ranked third on the "Nationwide Bookstore Employees' Recommended Comics" by the Honya Club website in 2016.

Tokyo-based dispatched labor company  included the series on a list of three manga series about protagonists who struggle to overcome their own weakness and self-doubt, recommended for low self-confidence people.

Sales
Volume 1 reached 23rd place on the weekly Oricon manga charts, with 38,128 copies sold; volume 2 reached 17th place, with 61,918 copies; volume 3 also reached 17th place, with 80,462 copies; volume 4 reached 13th place, with 93,866 copies; volume 5 reached 15th place, with 108,503 copies; and volume 6 reached 11th place, with 118,783 copies. As of December 2017, the manga had over 4.8 million copies in circulation; over 5.5 million copies in circulation by February 2018; over 7 million copies in circulation by January 2019; over 12 million copies in circulation by March 2021; over 15 million copies in circulation by May 2021; over 16 million copies in circulation by December 2021; over 17 million copies in circulation by June 2022. and over 18 million copies in circulation by November 2022.

The series ranked 48th on Rakuten's Top 100 Best Selling Digital Manga of 2019; it ranked 47th in 2020; 50th in 2021; and 47th in the first half of 2022.

Black Clover: Quartet Knights had over 300,000 copies in circulation by October 2020.

Critical reception
When reviewing the series for ComicsAlliance, Tom Speelman described the premise as "what if Harry Potter was a knight and also kinda dumb?" He recommended it for fans of Naruto and Fairy Tail, noting its similarities to the former series as well as to Bleach. He praised the author's ability to invigorate stock characters. Henry Ma of Ka Leo O Hawaii praised the series' humor and art, noting that the latter was "very nice" and was similar to Fairy Tail. Danica Davidson of Otaku USA noted that the first volume showed promise and recommended it for fans of action/adventure shonen manga. Matthew Warner from The Fandom Post, in his review of Volume 1, stated "With a likable enough main cast and a seemingly solid world, this volume gets the series off to a nice start." Leroy Douresseaux of ComicBookBin said that the story reminds him of some of his favorite shonen manga and has an intriguing backstory and internal mythology, calling it "one of the best new series of the year for young readers" and giving it an "A" rating. Dale Bashir of IGN Southeast Asia praised the series for its fast and engaging pacing, action sequences, and presentation of female characters on equal grounds compared to their male counterparts, calling it the "perfect encapsulation of the strengths and weaknesses of the shonen genre as a whole." However, not all critics were positive, with a board of comic book writers at San Diego Comic-Con listing the manga as one of the worst from 2016.

Anime
In November 2019, Crunchyroll listed Black Clover in their "Top 100 best anime of the 2010s". In January 2021, it was revealed that Black Clover was the most-watched anime series on Crunchyroll in 2020, being watched in 87 countries and territories all over the world. Asta and Yami's fight against Dante was also listed as the sixth best anime fight from 2021 by Crunchyroll.

Alex Osborn of IGN, in his review of the first episode, mentioned that its premise is not novel but concludes that it is "ultimately a solid introduction to the Clover Kingdom, and lays the groundwork for what will hopefully be an empowering story about the importance of never giving up." Writing for Anime News Network, Rachel Trujillo praised the anime for "the grand lessons that one can take away from the story" and ambitious animation efforts from the staff. In his review of Episode 170, Shawn Hacaga of The Fandom Post complimented the anime's improvement since its beginning, saying that he was "glad that Black Clover was able to turn it around." Ivy Rose from Anime Feminist praised the way the story handles its female characters, giving them narrative importance and letting them partake in battles. Rose wrote: "Black Clover has truly raised the bar for depictions of female leaders in shounen anime, and female characters in general, as these solid portrayals are not just limited to women in leadership positions."

Accolades

Notes

References

External links
  at Weekly Shōnen Jump 
  
  at Viz.com
 
 

2017 anime television series debuts
2019 anime ONAs
Adventure anime and manga
Animated television series about orphans
Anime series based on manga
Avex Group
Crunchyroll anime
Demons in anime and manga
Fantasy anime and manga
Funimation
Pierrot (company)
Shōnen manga
Shueisha franchises
Shueisha manga
Toonami
TV Tokyo original programming
Viz Media manga
Xebec (studio)